Dominator(s) may refer to:

People 
The Dominator, nickname for Mariusz Pudzianowski (Strongman and MMA fighter), a five-time World's Strongest Man
The Dominator, nickname for Wayne Johnston (born 1957), a Carlton footballer in Australia
The Dominator, nickname for Dominik Hašek, a Czech goalkeeper who played for HC Pardubice, Chicago Blackhawks, Buffalo Sabres, Detroit Red Wings and Ottawa Senators
Dominator, also known as Nils Fjellström, the drummer for Dark Funeral, Myrkskog, The Wretched End and ex-drummer for Aeon

Music 
 Dominator (Cloven Hoof album), an album by metal band Cloven Hoof
 Dominator (W.A.S.P. album), an album by metal band W.A.S.P.
 Dominator (The Time Frequency album), an album by Scottish techno band The Time Frequency
 Dominator (U.D.O. album), an album by metal band U.D.O.
 Dominator, festival music of Q-dance
 "Dominator" (Human Resource song), a 1991 Human Resource song

Amusement parks 
Dominator (roller coaster), a roller coaster formerly at Geauga Lake, now located at Kings Dominion
Dominator (ride), a ride at the Dorney Park & Wildwater Kingdom

Fiction and entertainment 
 Dominators (DC Comics), a fictional alien race published by DC Comics
 The Dominators, a 1968 Doctor Who serial and a fictional alien race in that universe
 Dominator, a 1984 novel by James Follett
 The Dominator, the antagonist of the first four novels of Glen Cook's The Black Company series
 Dominator, a type of accessory for Nintendo
 Dominator, a fictional vehicle from the G.I. Joe Battleforce 2000 toy line
 Dominator (comics), a British comic character created by Tony Luke
 The Dominator-class cruiser, a carrier type in the Imperial Navy in the Warhammer 40,000 universe
 Dominators, a character archetype in the computer game City of Villains
 Burnout Dominator, a 2007 video game in the PlayStation Burnout series
 Dominators, the psychometrically-activated weapons used by law enforcement officers in the anime series Psycho-Pass
 The Dominator, a minor antagonist in the fifth season of Samurai Jack
 The Dominator, the final boss of the 2019 video game Daemon X Machina

Transportation 
 Consolidated B-32 Dominator, a late World War II American strategic bomber
 Honda NX650 Dominator, a dual sport motorcycle by Honda
 SS Dominator, a Greek freighter lost in a 1961 shipwreck on the Palos Verdes Peninsula in California
 Aeronautics Defense Dominator, an Israeli UAV developed by Aeronautics Defense Systems Ltd
 Dennis Dominator, a bus chassis model manufactured by Dennis Specialist Vehicles
 Dominator, a name for the Persistent Munition Technology Demonstrator UAV developed by Boeing
 SRV Dominator, a tornado research vehicle built by Reed Timmer

Other uses 
 Dominator (graph theory), in computer science, a property of certain nodes in control-flow graphs
 Dominator culture, a term coined by futurist and writer Riane Eisler
 The Dominator, or Inverted Powerbomb, a professional wrestling move

See also
 Domination (disambiguation)
 Dominance (disambiguation)
 Dominate, the "despotic" later phase of government in the ancient Roman Empire